The East Fork Salmon River is a short tributary of the Salmon River in Clackamas County, in the U.S. state of Oregon. Its entire course lies within the Mount Hood National Forest. It has no named tributaries.

Near its headwaters, the river passes under Oregon Route 35 near Barlow Pass. Further downstream, it crosses Forest Road 3521 near the Pioneer Woman's Grave Trail. Shortly before reaching Red Top Meadow, the river passes under U.S. Route 26.

See also
List of rivers of Oregon

References

External links
Sandy River Basin Watershed Council

Rivers of Oregon
Mount Hood
Rivers of Clackamas County, Oregon
Mount Hood National Forest